Dobele District was an administrative division of Latvia, located in the Courland and Semigallia regions, in the country's centre. It was organized into two cities, a municipality and fifteen parishes, each with a local government authority. The main city in the district was Dobele.

Districts were eliminated during the administrative-territorial reform in 2009.

Cities, municipalities and parishes of the Dobele District

 Annenieki Parish
 Auce city
 Auri Parish
 Bēne Parish
 Bērze Parish
 Biksti Parish
 Dobele city
 Dobele Parish
 Īle Parish
 Jaunbērze Parish
 Krimūna Parish
 Lielauce Parish
 Naudīte Parish
 Penkule Parish
 Tērvete municipality
 Ukri Parish
 Vītiņi Parish
 Zebrene Parish

References 

Districts of Latvia